Mary Louise Poovey is an American cultural historian and literary critic whose work focuses on the Victorian Era.  She is currently Samuel Rudin University Professor in the Humanities at New York University, and Director of the Institute for the History of the Production of Knowledge.  Poovey has taught at Johns Hopkins University, Swarthmore College, and Yale University.

Education 
Poovey gained her PhD from the University of Virginia in 1976.

Proper women
In 1984 Poovey published The Proper Lady and the Woman Writer: Ideology as Style in the Works of Mary Wollstonecraft, Mary Shelley, and Jane Austen. Her book is based around the idea of a "Proper Lady" and she looks at the difficulties that these three important authors had in breaking free from this mould.

Feminist readings
Poovey has been recognised as important in the work that she has done in feminist reading. She has looked at how the growth of women writing was a device for seeing their voices emerge.

Poovey conducted a public re-evaluation in 1999 at the British Women Writers Conference as a theoretical exercise of a writer's work. Poovey re-read the works of Ellen Pickering and decided that they were not worth reviving. This novelist's works had been popular in the 19th century but she considered the books to be over-complicated and lacking in innovation. She concluded that the only reason to re-read works like this was to confirm that the books that we had chosen to remember, like Jane Eyre and Mary Barton, are the best of their type. Poovey used her re-reading of Pickering's novels to argue that not all writers need to be revived into the literary canon. Tamara Wagner went on to argue that this shows that we need to debunk our "history of reading these texts back from reality"?

Honors 
On January 30, 2015 Poovey received an honorary doctorate from the Faculty of Social Sciences at Uppsala University, Sweden.

Works

PhD Thesis
 

Her books include:

  Preview.
 
 
  Preview.
 
  Preview.
 
  Preview.

References

External links

The Sigmund H. Danziger, Jr. Memorial Lecture in the Humanities(Sigmund H Danziger, Jr Memorial Lecture in the Humanities 1997-1998)
Mary Poovey Papers - Pembroke Center Archives, Brown University

Living people
American literary critics
Women literary critics
University of Virginia alumni
21st-century American historians
American women historians
21st-century American women writers
Year of birth missing (living people)
Mary Wollstonecraft scholars
American women critics